Margaret Wetzel House is a historic home at 714 21st Street, Northwest, Washington, D.C., in the Foggy Bottom neighborhood.

History
The house was built for Margaret Wetzel, from 1853 to 1857, in the Italian Villa style.
The building was acquired by George Washington University in 1931. It served as the Faculty Club; The University Alumni office was located there from 1974 to 1999. The building has housed the University Honors Program since 2005.

The building is listed on the National Register of Historic Places and is a Washington, D.C. Landmark.

References

Houses completed in 1853
Houses on the National Register of Historic Places in Washington, D.C.
Italianate architecture in Washington, D.C.
George Washington University buildings and structures
Foggy Bottom
1857 establishments in Washington, D.C.